Graham Pearce is a football (soccer) player who represented New Zealand at international level.

Pearce played three official full internationals for New Zealand, making his debut in a 0–0 draw with Malaysia on 13 August 2000.

References

External links
 
 

1977 births
Living people
New Zealand association footballers
New Zealand international footballers
Association football defenders
Waitakere United players
WaiBOP United players
Eastern Suburbs AFC players
Napier City Rovers FC players
University-Mount Wellington players